Abū ʿAbd al-Raḥmān Muḥammad ibn Marwān ibn al-Ḥakam (died 719/720) was an Umayyad prince and one of the most important generals of the Umayyad Caliphate in the period 690–710, and the one who completed the Arab conquest of Armenia. He defeated the Byzantines and conquered their Armenian territories, crushed an Armenian rebellion in 704–705 and made the country into an Umayyad province. His son Marwan II was the last Umayyad caliph.

Life 
Muhammad was the son of Caliph Marwan I by a slave girl named Zaynab, and hence half-brother to Caliph Abd al-Malik ibn Marwan.

When Marwan assumed the throne, he sent Muhammad to Upper Mesopotamia to secure Armenia. In 691, he commanded his brother's advance guard at the Battle of Maskin against Mus'ab ibn al-Zubayr (brother of the Mecca-based rival caliph Abdallah ibn al-Zubayr). In 692/3, he defeated a Byzantine army in the Battle of Sebastopolis, by persuading the large Slavic contingent of the imperial army to defect to him. In the next year, he invaded Byzantine Asia Minor with the assistance of the same Slavs, and scored a success against a Byzantine army near Germanikeia, while in 695, he raided the province of Fourth Armenia.

In 699–701, along with his nephew, Abdallah ibn Abd al-Malik, he was dispatched to Iraq to assist the governor al-Hajjaj ibn Yusuf in the suppression of the rebellion of Abd al-Rahman ibn Muhammad ibn al-Ash'ath. In 701 Muhammad campaigned against the Byzantine-controlled Armenian territory east of the Euphrates, and forced its population and the local governor, Baanes, to submit to the Caliphate. Soon after his departure, however, the Armenians rebelled and called for Byzantine aid. Repeated campaigns in 703 and 704 by Muhammad and Abdallah ibn Abd al-Malik crushed the revolt, and Muhammad further secured Muslim control by organizing a large-scale massacre of the Armenian princely  families in 705.

When al-Walid I acceded to the throne in 705, Muhammad began to be eclipsed by his nephew Maslama ibn Abd al-Malik, who like him was also born to a slave-girl. Maslama assumed the leadership of the campaigns against Byzantium, and finally replaced Muhammad completely in his capacity as governor of Mesopotamia, Armenia and Azerbaijan in 709/10. Muhammad died in 719/20.

Wives and children
Muhammad was the father of the last Umayyad caliph, Marwan II through an unnamed woman, most likely of non-Arab origin (a Kurd according to some accounts). Some sources report that Muhammad had taken her captive during the suppression of Ibn al-Zubayr's revolt.

Muhammad was also wed to two Qurayshite women, Umm Jumayl bint Abd al-Rahman, the granddaughter of Zayd ibn al-Khattab of the Banu Adi clan, and Bint Yazid ibn Abd Allah, the granddaughter of Shaybah ibn Rabi'ah of the Banu Abd Shams, the parent clan of the Umayyads.

References

Sources 
 
 
 

 
 

8th-century deaths
Arab generals
Umayyad people of the Arab–Byzantine wars
Sons of Umayyad caliphs
Generals of the Umayyad Caliphate
Year of birth unknown
7th-century Arabs
8th-century Arabs
Umayyad governors of Arminiya